Vampira is a 1974 British comedy horror film directed by Clive Donner, and starring David Niven and Teresa Graves. The spoof of the vampire genre was re-titled Old Dracula for release in the United States, in an attempt to ride the success of Young Frankenstein.

Plot
Count Dracula is an old vampire who, because of his advanced age, is forced to host tours of his castle to get new victims. In an attempt to revive his long-lost love, Vampira, Dracula needs to find a victim with a very specific blood group combination to resurrect Vampira by a blood transfusion. So he sets out to collect blood from the bevy of Playboy Playmates visiting his castle. However, one of the Playmates whose blood is drained is black, turning the revived Vampira into a black woman.

Dracula enthralls the hapless Marc to collect blood from three white women in hopes of restoring Vampira's original skin color. Dracula transfuses the blood into her but she is unchanged; however, her bite turns Dracula black. Marc and his love Angela race to destroy Dracula but are taken aback upon seeing Dracula's new skin tone. Their surprise gives the vampires time to slip away to catch a flight to Rio for Carnival.

Cast

Release
The film was released theatrically in the United States by American International Pictures in 1975, under the title Old Dracula in an attempt to cash in on the success of director Mel Brooks 1974 horror movie spoof Young Frankenstein. Exhibitors frequently paired Old Dracula on a double bill with  Young Frankenstein.

Reception
Roger Ebert, writing for the Chicago Sun-Times, gave the film one out of four stars, describing it as a mess with only Niven being a highlight, describing the film as a "depressing exercise" due to not being to the standard of British horror films of the time and feeling dated to the previous decade.

Trivia
In the opening scene, David Niven aka Dracula flips through the July 1973 issue of US Playboy Magazine

References

External links 

1974 films
1974 horror films
American International Pictures films
British comedy horror films
British vampire films
1970s comedy horror films
Films shot at EMI-Elstree Studios
1970s English-language films
Dracula films
1970s parody films
Films directed by Clive Donner
Vampire comedy films
1974 comedy films
Films set in castles
1970s British films